Jeffrey Sterling may refer to:
Jeffrey Sterling, Baron Sterling of Plaistow (born 1934), British businessman
Jeffrey Alexander Sterling, American lawyer and former CIA officer convicted under the Espionage Act